Chen Bangzhu (born September 1934) is a Chinese politician who served as  from 1995 to 1998 and governor of Hunan from 1989 to 1994.

Biography
Chen was born in Jiujiang, Jiangxi, in September 1934, during the Republic of China. In 1954, he graduated from Chongqing Jianzhu University (now Chongqing University). He joined the Chinese Communist Party in October 1975. In his early years, he worked in northeast China's Jilin province. He worked in the  before serving as mayor of Yueyang in August 1983. He was appointed vice governor of Hunan in 1984 and promoted to member of the standing committee of the CPC Hunan Provincial Committee, the province's top authority. He also served as director of Hunan Foreign Economic and Trade Commission between August 1984 and January 1985. In 1987, he became an alternate member of the 13th Central Committee of the Chinese Communist Party. In May 1989, he was prompted to become governor of Hunan, succeeding Xiong Qingquan. In 1992, he became a member of the 14th Central Committee of the Chinese Communist Party.

In February 1995, Chen was transferred to Beijing and appointed . In 1997, he became a member of the 15th Central Committee of the Chinese Communist Party. In March 1998, he was appointed deputy director of the State Economic and Trade Commission. In March 2000, he became a member of the 9th Standing Committee of the Chinese People's Political Consultative Conference. In May 1998, he took office as a member of the Preparatory Committee of the Macao Special Administrative Region. In June 2000, he was made chairperson of the Population, Resources and Environment Committee of the Chinese People's Political Consultative Conference, serving in the post until his retirement in March 2008.

References

1934 births
Living people
People from Jiujiang
Chongqing University alumni
People's Republic of China politicians from Jiangxi
Chinese Communist Party politicians from Jiangxi
Governors of Hunan
Mayors of Yueyang
Alternate members of the 13th Central Committee of the Chinese Communist Party
Members of the 14th Central Committee of the Chinese Communist Party
Members of the 15th Central Committee of the Chinese Communist Party
Members of the Standing Committee of the 9th Chinese People's Political Consultative Conference
Members of the Standing Committee of the 10th Chinese People's Political Consultative Conference